The Ranger may refer to:

The Ranger (film), 2018
The Ranger (1918 film), a silent western film starring Shorty Hamilton
A character in Batmen of All Nations comic books

See also
Ranger (disambiguation)